Gausfred I (died 991) was the count of Empúries and Rosselló from 931 until his death. He was the son and successor of Gausbert. He spent his whole life consolidating his authority in his counties, but he divided the realm amongst his sons. By his testament of 989, Empúries and Perelada went to Hugh and Roussillon went to Giselbert.

He married firstly Ava Guisla, probably the daughter of Raymond II, count of Rouergue. By her he had:

Hugh (c. 965-1040), count of Empúries and Perelada
Sunyer (died c. 978), bishop of Elna
Giselbert (died 1013), count of Roussillon
Guisla

He married secondly Sibylla, with whom he had no children.

|-

References

Counts of Empúries
Counts of Roussillon
10th-century births
991 deaths
10th-century Catalan people
10th-century Visigothic people